Motocross Madness may refer to:

 Motocross Madness, a series of motocross racing video games published by Microsoft Studios
 Motocross Madness (1998 video game), developed by Rainbow Studios
 Motocross Madness 2, released in 2000 and also developed by Rainbow Studios
 Motocross Madness (2013 video game), developed by Bongfish